This article lists the chiefs of the General Staff of the Argentine Army and their preceding offices, between 1962 and the present day. The Argentine Army is the land force of Argentina.

The current Chief of the Army General Staff is Brigadier General Agustín Humberto Cejas. He was appointed by President Alberto Fernández on 28 February 2020 by Decree 181/2020.

List

See also

Argentine Army
Chief of the General Staff of the Argentine Navy
Chief of the General Staff of the Argentine Air Force

References

Argentine Army officers
Argentine generals
Argentine military-related lists
Argentina